Maharajganj is an assembly constituency in Siwan district in the Indian state of Bihar.

Overview
As per Delimitation of Parliamentary and Assembly constituencies Order, 2008, No. 112 Maharajganj Assembly constituency is composed of the following: Maharajganj and Bhagwanpur Hat community development blocks.

Maharajganj Assembly constituency is part of No. 19 Maharajganj (Lok Sabha constituency).

Members of Legislative Assembly

Election results

2020

1977–2020
In the 2015 Bihar Legislative Assembly Elections, Hemnarayan Sah of JDU won by defeating Devranjan Singh of Bharatiya Janta Party. In the 2010 state assembly elections, Damodar Singh of JD(U) won the Maharajganj assembly seat defeating his nearest rival Manik Chand Rai of RJD. Contests in most years were multi cornered but only winners and runners up are being mentioned. Damodar Singh of JD(U) defeated Uma Shakar Singh of RJD in October 2005 and February 2005. Uma Shankar Singh representing SAP defeated Damodar Singh, Independent, in 2000.  Baidya Nath Pande of JD defeated Damodar Singh of Congress in 1995. Uma Shanker Singh of JD Anusuya Devi of Congress in 1990. Uma Shankar Singh of JP defeated Anusya Jayaswal of Congress in 1985. Uma Shankar Singh of Janata Party (Secular – Charan Singh) defeated Anusuya Jayaswal of Congress in 1980. Uma Shankar Singh of JP defeated Nand Kishore Singh, Independent, in 1977.

References

External links
 

Assembly constituencies of Bihar
Politics of Siwan district